This is a list of first-level country subdivisions within the Caribbean in order of total area. Those administrative divisions that are the largest within their respective countries are highlighted in bold. The list also contains first-level administrative divisions from countries such as Guyana, Suriname, and Belize, which are technically not a part of the Caribbean, but because of their Caribbean cultural heritage are widely accepted. (All references are taken from various Wikipedia articles.) For related lists, see below.

See also

List of Caribbean islands by area
List of Caribbean islands by political affiliation
List of Caribbean island countries by population
List of metropolitan areas in the West Indies

West Indian first-level country subdivisions
First-level